Bulldog Sees it Through is a 1940 British, black-and-white, mystery war film directed by Harold Huth and starring  Jack Buchanan, Greta Gynt, Googie Withers, Ronald Shiner as Pug and Sebastian Shaw.

Plot
This is not a Bulldog Drummond picture despite the title playing off Jack Buchanan and his previous association with the character. Here he plays the role of Test Pilot 'Bulldog' Bill Watson. His friend Derek Sinclair (Sebastian Shaw) is convinced that the new man in his love's life is collaborating with the Nazis by sabotaging an armaments plant.

Cast
 Jack Buchanan as Bill Watson
 Greta Gynt as Jane Sinclair
 Googie Withers as Toots
 Sebastian Shaw as Derek Sinclair
 David Hutcheson as Freddie Caryll
 Robert Newton as Watkins
 Arthur Hambling as Inspector Horn
 Wylie Watson as Dancing Professor
 Polly Ward as Miss Fortescue
 Ronald Shiner as Pug
 Aubrey Mallalieu as Magistrate
 Raymond Huntley as Tramp Steamer Officer

Critical reception
The Observer wrote in 1940, "a prophetic but slow-footed war-time thriller, chiefly notable for the first really good impersonation of Lord Haw-Haw."

References

External links
 
 
 

1940 films
1940s mystery thriller films
British black-and-white films
Films directed by Harold Huth
British World War II propaganda films
World War II spy films
British mystery thriller films
British spy films
Mystery war films
Films with screenplays by Patrick Kirwan
1940s English-language films